is a former Japanese Nippon Professional Baseball player and current coach.

External links

1960 births
Living people
Baseball people from Hyōgo Prefecture
Japanese baseball players
Nippon Professional Baseball infielders
Kintetsu Buffaloes players
Hiroshima Toyo Carp players
Nankai Hawks players
Fukuoka Daiei Hawks players
Managers of baseball teams in Japan
Orix Buffaloes managers